FC Uralan Elista is a football club based in Elista, Kalmykia, Russia.

History
FC Elista was founded in 2005 following the dissolution of its predecessor, FC Uralan Elista. The club entered South zone of the Amateur Football League and finished second. That result was not enough to warrant automatic promotion, but the extension of the South zone of the Russian Second Division allowed Elista to move one level up. In 2006 FC Elista withdrew from the competition after 18 rounds. The club was restarted in 2014, as FC Uralan Elista in the Russian Amateur Football League.

Colours are (Home) all blue. (Away) Either yellow shirts with blue arms, yellow shorts or all black.

FC Uralan Elista
Football Club Uralan Elista was founded in 1958 as a construction trust team. Uralan means "forward" in Kalmyk. The team have won Kalmyk championship and cup every year until 1965. In 1966, they were admitted to the B class of the Soviet league. The team played at the same level (call Soviet Second League since 1971) until 1991. Their best result was a second position in 1991.

Uralan played in the Russian First Division since 1992. They won the tournament in 1997 and were promoted to the Top Division. Their best result was seventh position in 1998. Uralan were relegated after finishing last in 2000, but won promotion back at the first time of asking. They spent another two seasons at top level before being relegated in 2003.

In the 2004 season, the club experienced financial problems. The players' wages were not paid for at least six months, this led to many of them leaving Uralan. The club was able to field only ten players for the league match on 7 July (including two goalkeepers, one of whom played as a striker) and only nine players on 24 July. However, Uralan managed to fulfill all fixtures.

Kirsan Ilyumzhinov was the honorary president of FC Uralan.

New club
Uralan was to be relegated to the Second Division, but refused to enter the competition on 22 March 2005. A new club, FC Elista, was formed in its place. 80 percent of Elista players were from reserve and youth teams of Uralan.

The club was restarted in 2014, as FC Uralan Elista in the Russian Amateur Football League, but folded in late 2015.

The club was reformed, again, in 2021, competing in the Russian third tier. .

Reserve squad
Uralan's reserve squad played professionally as FC Uralan-d Elista in the Russian Third League in 1994–1996.

Notable players
Had international caps for their respective countries. Players whose names are listed in bold represented their countries while playing for Uralan/FC Elista.

Russia
     Akhrik Tsveiba
  Daur Akhvlediani
  Maksim Bokov
  Igor Chugainov
  Aleksandr Filimonov
  Denis Kolodin
  Andrei Kondrashov
 Oleg Kuzmin
  Alexey Smertin
  Oleg Veretennikov

Former USSR countries
  Samir Aliyev
  Garnik Avalyan
  Tigran Petrosyan
  Arthur Voskanyan
  Vital Bulyga
  Vyacheslav Geraschenko

  Vital Lanko
  Alyaksandar Lukhvich
  Aliaksandr Oreshnikov
  Vadim Skripchenko
  Yuri Shukanov
  Mark Švets
  Valeri Abramidze
  Giorgi Davitnidze
  Vasil Gigiadze
  Sevasti Todua
  Vitaliy Abramov
  Yuri Aksenov
  Dmitriy Lyapkin
  Valērijs Ivanovs
  Aleksandrs Jelisejevs
  Vidas Dancenka
  Saulius Mikalajūnas

  Vasile Coşelev
  Vitalie Maevici
  Radu Rebeja
  Arsen Avakov
  Andriy Annenkov
  Oleksiy Antyukhyn
  Yuriy Hrytsyna
  Oleksandr Kyryukhin
  Pavlo Shkapenko
  Artem Yashkin
   Sergei Kormiltsev
  Sergey Lushan
  Aleksandr Sayun

West Europe
  Alessandro Dal Canto
  Dario Passoni

South America
  Víctor López
  Sebastián Morquio
  Fernando Martínez

References

External links
Hoe FC Uralan schaakmat werd gezet (in Dutch). (archive link)

 
Sport in Elista
Association football clubs established in 1958
1958 establishments in Russia